Lawrence Michael Brown FRS (born 1936) is a Canadian physicist, known for his pioneering work on the application of transmission electron microscopy to metals, diamond, nuclear materials and semiconductors. He has spent much of his career at the Cavendish Laboratory, which he joined in 1960. He played an important role in establishing the SuperSTEM facility at Daresbury Laboratory.

References

External links
 Brown's page at the website of the University of Cambridge
 Official website of SuperSTEM
 Profile of Professor Brown from Microscopy and Analysis magazine November 2021

1936 births
Living people
Canadian physicists
Fellows of Robinson College, Cambridge
Fellows of the Royal Society
Scientists of the Cavendish Laboratory
Microscopists